A fortification is a military construction or building designed for defense in warfare.

Fortification may also refer to:
Food fortification, the process of adding micronutrients to food products
Fortification, New Zealand
Wine fortification, the addition of other forms of alcohol to wine
Addition of vitamins to food, like Breakfast cereals

See also
Fort (disambiguation)